Bergesen Island is an uninhabited island located in the Qikiqtaaluk Region of Nunavut, Canada. It is located in Baffin Bay off the northeastern coast of Baffin Island. The Dymond Islands lie close to its southwest.

References

External links 
 Bergesen Island in the Atlas of Canada - Toporama; Natural Resources Canada

Islands of Baffin Island
Islands of Baffin Bay
Uninhabited islands of Qikiqtaaluk Region